Siiri Perälä (1 June 1993 – 5 January 2022) was a Finnish football and futsal player. She played in the Naisten Futsal-Liiga from 2017 to 2021 and won the league championship in 2019. Perälä earned five caps in the Finnish women's futsal team from 2019 to 2020.

Perälä also played football in the Naisten Ykkönen, Kakkonen and Kolmos from 2014 to 2019, representing Jyväskylä Pallokerho and FC Espoo.

Personal life and death
Perälä was diagnosed with B-cell lymphoma in the spring of 2020, and died on 5 January 2022, at the age of 28.

References

1993 births
2022 deaths
Deaths from cancer in Finland
Deaths from lymphoma
Finnish women's futsal players
Finnish women's footballers
People from Jämsä
Women's association footballers not categorized by position
Sportspeople from Central Finland